Kirkland Correctional Institution is a state prison for men located in Columbia, Richland County, South Carolina, United States, owned and operated by the South Carolina Department of Corrections.  

Kirkland has a special role in South Carolina's prison system as the point of intake and assessment for all male state prisoners, the site of the state's Maximum Security Unit, and a health care facility.  The prison was first opened in 1975, and houses a maximum of 1707 inmates, plus another 50 in the Max unit and 24 in the infirmary. In September 2017, death row inmates were moved to Kirkland Correctional Institution.    

The state's Broad River Correctional Institution is adjacent to the north.

References

Prisons in South Carolina
Buildings and structures in Richland County, South Carolina
1975 establishments in South Carolina
Capital punishment in the United States